Erythroxylum ecarinatuma is a Southwest Pacific and Australian species of Erythroxylum.

It is an Australian rainforest timber tree locally called "brown plum".

References

External links
 Erythroxylum ecarinatum - A comprehensive review of Erythroxylum ecarinatum.

ecarinatum
Flora of the Southwestern Pacific
Malpighiales of Australia
Flora of the Northern Territory